Caywood may refer to:

 Caywood, Ohio, United States
 Mount Caywood, Palmer Land, Antarctica

People with the surname
 Alfred Beebe Caywood (1910–1991), Canadian aviator
 Betty Caywood (born c. 1930), American sportscaster
 Keith Caywood (1919–1992), American football coach
 Les Caywood (1903–1986), American football player
 Thomas Caywood (1919–2008), American computer scientist

See also
 Caywood Estates, Alberta, Canada
 Cawood (disambiguation)